Básico Instinto (Portuguese for "Basic Instinct") is the third and currently last studio album by the Brazilian musician Fausto Fawcett. It was released on June 18, 1993 through Chaos (a now-defunct subsidiary of Sony Music).

Unlike its two predecessors, Básico Instinto doesn't count on the participation of Fawcett's backing band Os Robôs Efêmeros; for this release he created a new project, the "Falange Moulin Rouge" ("Moulin Rouge Phalanx"), which was composed of many popular Brazilian musicians at the time, particularly Dado Villa-Lobos (of Legião Urbana), Dé Palmeira (of Barão Vermelho), Ary Dias (of A Cor do Som), Charles Gavin (of Titãs) and João Barone (of Os Paralamas do Sucesso). Fawcett's frequent collaborator Carlos Laufer was the only original member of Os Robôs Efêmeros to remain in the Falange Moulin Rouge. Pagode group Grupo Raça also made a guest appearance on the track "Pagode da Lourinha".

More elaborate, experimental and instrumentally diverse than Fawcett's two previous albums, he describes it as a "samba-funk revue" based on his two books Santa Clara Poltergeist (1990) and Básico Instinto (1992). After the album's release Fawcett continued to tour around Brazil with Falange Moulin Rouge until he decided to stop making albums to dedicate himself to his literary career.

Track listing

Personnel
 Fausto Fawcett – vocals
 Dado Villa-Lobos – electric guitar
 Dé Palmeira – bass guitar
 Carlos Laufer – electric guitar
 Charles Gavin – drums
 Ary Dias – percussion
 João Barone – percussion (track 12)
 Paulo Futura – DJ
 Marinara Costa – additional vocals
 Kátia Bronstein – additional vocals
 Regininha Poltergeist – additional vocals
 Luzia Maia – additional vocals
 Gisele Rosa – additional vocals
 Grupo Raça – additional vocals, arrangements (track 8)
 Carlos Savalla – production
 Jorge Davidson – art direction

References

1993 albums
Concept albums
Fausto Fawcett albums
Sony Music Brazil albums